Oona Anniina Sormunen (born 2 August 1989 in Kitee, Finland) is a Finnish javelin thrower. She has represented Finland in 2010 and 2012 European Championships.

Sormunen has a personal best of 60.56m set in 2013.

Competition record

References

1989 births
Living people
People from Kitee
Finnish female javelin throwers
Sportspeople from North Karelia